The pepito is a sandwich prepared with beef, pork, or chicken<ref name="DRAE">pepito in the Diccionario de la lengua española, Real Academia Española, 23.ª ed. Madrid: Espasa, 2014.</ref> originating from Spain and also very popular in Latin America. It is a common street food in Venezuela and is also available at some U.S. restaurants. The pepito is sometimes referred to as a type of torta sandwich, and has been referred to as a "traditional Mexican torta". For the beef version, various cuts of beef are used, and myriad additional ingredients can also be used in its preparation.

Preparation
The pepito is prepared with grilled beef tenderloin, flank steak, rib eye steak or strip steak, refried beans, black beans or pinto beans, and a soft roll, bun or baguette as primary ingredients. Chicken meat is also used sometimes.

Additional ingredients used can be myriad, including but not limited to eggs, cheese, lettuce, sliced or diced tomato, sliced avocado, guacamole, guasacaca (an avocado-based relish), garlic, cilantro, olives, jalapeño or pickled jalapeño peppers, onions, caramelized onions, or sautéed onions, crema or mayonnaise, butter, olive oil, fresh lime juice, Worcestershire sauce, hot sauce, mustard, cumin, salt and pepper.

Some versions of the sandwich have a significant amount of toppings and garnishes, while others are simpler preparations using only the base ingredients and a few additional ingredients.

In Latin America
The pepito is a common street food in Venezuela and originates in Barquisimeto, the capital of the state of Lara in Venezuela. The pepito is one of the most popular street foods in Venezuela. It is purveyed at some restaurants and department stores in Mexico City. In Venezuela, they are sometimes sold by street vendors, who often provide several sauces that can be added atop the sandwich. The customer can typically tell the vendor what ingredients and toppings to use on the sandwich in Venezuela.

In Spain
Bars with a kitchen often offer a pepito de ternera (beef sandwich), cooked on demand.
The name has extended to other sandwiches.
Those made of cured pork tenderloin are also called montado de lomo.
Variations adding pressed ham and cheese, bacon, fried, roasted or preserved peppers are also common.
Teodoro Bardají Mas, a cuisine historian and cook, offered an origin story in an article in the weekly Ellas.

In the United States
Some restaurants in the United States purvey the pepito, such as in Miami, Chicago, Illinois, California, Atlanta and other U.S. cities.

 Other meanings
In Spanish, a pepito'' can also be an elongated bun filled with cream or chocolate.

See also

 Arepa
 List of sandwiches
 List of street foods

Notes

References

Mexican cuisine
Venezuelan cuisine
Street food
Beef steak dishes
Olive dishes
Beef sandwiches
Pork sandwiches
Chicken sandwiches
Spanish cuisine
Avocado dishes